Kamnje is a village on the northern edge of the Vipava Valley in the Municipality of Ajdovščina in the Littoral region of Slovenia.

The parish church in the settlement is dedicated to Saint Michael and belongs to the Koper Diocese.

References

External links 
Kamnje at Geopedia

Populated places in the Municipality of Ajdovščina